Kenneth Thomas Weetch (born 17 September 1933) is a former Labour Party politician in England.

Early life
Weetch was educated at Newbridge Grammar School and the London School of Economics. He then qualified as a teacher and held various posts in education.

Parliamentary career
Having unsuccessfully fought Saffron Walden in 1970, he was elected Member of Parliament (MP) for Ipswich at the October 1974 general election. He held the seat until the 1987 general election, when, against the national trend, he lost his seat to the Conservative Michael Irvine.

References

The Times Guide to the House of Commons, Times Newspapers Ltd, 1987

External links 
 

1933 births
Living people
Labour Party (UK) MPs for English constituencies
Members of the Parliament of the United Kingdom for Ipswich
UK MPs 1974–1979
UK MPs 1979–1983
UK MPs 1983–1987